Estonia sent 27 athletes to the 2006 Winter Olympics in Turin, Italy. Half of them competed in cross-country skiing, where Estonia won all of their three Turin Olympic medals. Olympic champion Andrus Veerpalu participated on his 5th Winter Olympics.

Medalists

Competitors
The following is a list of the number of competitors participating at the Games per sport/discipline.

*Including a reserve Raul Olle, who did not compete

Alpine skiing 

Note: In the men's combined, run 1 is the downhill, and runs 2 and 3 are the slalom. In the women's combined, run 1 and 2 are the slalom, and run 3 the downhill.

Biathlon

Cross-country skiing 

Distance

Men

Women

Sprint

 Raul Olle was a reserve for the men's relay team, but did not race in any events at the Games.

Figure skating 

Key: CD = Compulsory dance, FD = Free dance, FS = Free skate, OD = Original dance, SP = Short program

Nordic combined 

Note: 'Deficit' refers to the amount of time behind the leader a competitor began the cross-country portion of the event. Italicized numbers show the final deficit from the winner's finishing time.

Ski jumping

The Estonian Delegation

The Estonian Olympic Committee sent 28 athletes and 30 representatives to those games. 
 Representatives
NOC representatives were president Mart Siimann and secretary Toomas Tõnise. Estonian team representatives were delegation head: Martti Raju, press attaché Sven Sommer, Kristjan Oja in biathlon, Tiit Pekk in cross-country skiing and Gunnar Kuura in figure skating.

 Team coaches
Kenneth Ellis – alpine skiing, Raini Pohlak and Hillar Zahkna – biathlon, Mati Alaver and Anatoli Šmigun – cross country skiing, Anna Levandi and Ardo Rennik – figure skating, Toomas Nurmsalu – Nordic combined, Hillar Hein – ski jumping.

Biathlon team: Egert Ispert and Tiit Orlovski biathlon service team, Margo Ool – biathlon massage therapist.

Cross-country skiing team: medical doctors and therapists (Tarvo Kiudma, Mihkel Mardna, Lauri Rannama, Meelis Albert) and service team (Margo Pulles, Peep Koidu, Kristjan-Thor Vähi, Are Mets, Magne Myrmo, Eero Bergman, Michael Hasler, Urmas Välbe, Oleg Ragilo, Raul Seema, Assar Jõepera).
VIP guests
 Arnold Rüütel – the President of the Republic of Estonia,
 Andrus Ansip – the Prime Minister of Estonia,
 Raivo Palmaru – the Minister of Culture,
 Urmas Paet –  the Foreign Minister.

Judges
Kalju Valgus in biathlon.

Press

Gunnar Press, Jaan Martinson, Tarmo Paju, Mati Hiis (SL Õhtuleht), Andrus Nilk, Risto Berendsen, Tiit Lääne, Marko Mumm (Eesti Päevaleht), Veiko Visnapuu, Deivil Tserp, Priit Pullerits, Raigo Pajula (Postimees), Raul Ranne (Eesti Ekspress), Enn Hallik (Pärnu Postimees), Sulev Oll (Maaleht), Marko Kaljuveer, Lembitu Kuuse, Ivar Jurtšenko, Helar Osila, Anu Säärits, Tauno Peit, Teet Konksi, Valeri Tiivas (Eesti Televisioon), Tiit Karuks, Tarmo Tiisler, Erik Lillo, Hanno Tomber (Eesti Raadio), Margus Uba (European Broadcasting Union).

Estonian team at the opening ceremony
Flag bearer: Eveli Saue (biathlon) 
Athletes: Eveli Saue – biathlon and Tiiu Nurmberg – alpine skiing
Representatives: Hillar Zahkna, Raini Pohlak, Egert Ispert, Margo Ool, Gunnar Kuura, Ardo Rennik, Kenneth Ellis, Mart Siimann, Toomas Tõnise and Sven Sommer.

Estonian 2006 Olympic Books
Indrek Schwede – XX taliolümpiamängud. Torino 2006. Tallinn, Inreko Press, 2006.() 
Gunnar Press – Torino 2006. XX taliolümpiamängud. Tallinn, Ajakirjade Kirjastus, EOK, Postimees, SL Õhtuleht, 2006

References

External links

 EOK – Torino 2006 

Nations at the 2006 Winter Olympics
2006
Winter Olympics